Macia is a name of Spanish origin. In Catalan, Macià is a variant of the given name Maties. In Spanish, Macía is a variant of the surname Macias.

People with the given name
 Macià Alavedra (1934–2018), Spanish politician

People with the surname
 Antonio Macia, American screenwriter and actor
 Ariel Macia (born 1970), Argentine footballer
 Eduardo Macià (born 1974), Spanish football recruiter
 Francesc Macià (1859–1933), Spanish Army officer and President of Catalonia
 José Macia (born 1935), better known as Pepe, Brazilian footballer and manager
 Mariel Maciá (born 1980), Argentine-Spanish filmmaker
 Mido Macia (c. 1985–2013), Mozambican immigrant murdered by South African police officers
 Oswaldo Maciá (born 1960), Colombian–British sculptor
 Salvador Maciá (1855–1929), Argentine doctor and politician
 Silvia Maciá (born 1972), American marine biologist

See also
 Macia, a town in Gaza Province, Mozambique
 Maciá, a village and municipality in Entre Ríos Province, Argentina
 Macías (fl. 1340–1370), Galician troubadour

References

Surnames of Spanish origin